Bazita Peak TV Tower is a  broadcasting tower in Zalaegerszeg, Hungary. The tower has a  antenna atop the main structure and an observation level  up the structure.  The Alps can be clearly seen from the observation deck. Built in 1975, an elevator transports visitors to the café on the observation level and a staircase outside of the main shaft allows maintenance access.

See also 
 List of towers

External links 
 
Kiskutas tourist information

Towers in Hungary